John Dolan may refer to:

 John P. Dolan (born 1962), American Catholic prelate
 John Dolan (writer) (born 1955), American poet and novelist, responsible for the War Nerd podcasts
 John Dolan (baseball) (1867–1948), American Major League Baseball pitcher
 John Dolan (poker player), one of the "November Nine" in the 2010 World Series of Poker
 Johnny Dolan (1849/50–1876), American murderer
 John Dolan (artist) (born 1971), British artist
 John Dolan (politician) (born 1956), Irish senator
 John F. Dolan (1922–2013), member of the Massachusetts State Legislature

See also
 Jerry Dolan (John Dolan, 1901–1986), Australian footballer for East Fremantle and politician
 Jack Dolan (1906–2001), Australian footballer for Essendon
 John Dolan School, Eastview, Saskatoon, Canada
 Jonathan Dolan (born 1967), American politician